Warren Delano may refer to:
 Warren Delano Jr., American merchant, grandfather of Franklin D. Roosevelt
 Warren Delano IV, American horseman and coal tycoon
 Warren Lyford DeLano, advocate for the increased adoption of open source practices in the sciences